Hellinsia fusciciliatus is a moth of the family Pterophoridae. It is found in Colombia, Costa Rica and Venezuela.

The wingspan is 21 mm. The forewings are ochreous and the markings ferruginous. The hindwings and fringes are brown‑grey. Adults are on wing in February to May and October.

References

Moths described in 1877
fusciciliatus
Moths of South America
Moths of Central America